Simpani is a village town and Former village development committee  in [[Khotehang gaupalika
]] in the Sagarmatha Zone of eastern state 1.Nepal. At the time of the 1991 Nepal census it had a population of 3,597 persons living in 676 individual households. According to Simpani VDC record in 2008, its total population is 5713.

References

External links
UN map of the municipalities of Khotang District

Populated places in Khotang District